Stadium is a rapid transit station on the Green Line of the Dubai Metro in the Deira area of Dubai, UAE.

The station opened as part of the Green Line on 9 September 2011. It is close to the Rashid Stadium (hence the name), Al Mulla Plaza, Amity School, and Dubai Municipality Quarters. The station is also close to a number of bus routes.

References

Railway stations in the United Arab Emirates opened in 2011
Dubai Metro stations